"Angel (Ladadi O-Heyo)" is a song by German electronic music duo Jam & Spoon featuring American singer Plavka, released in 1995 as the fourth and last single from their second album, Tripomatic Fairytales 2001 (1993). It is written by German music writer Nosie Katzmann, who also wrote the duos former hits, "Right in the Night" and "Find Me (Odyssey to Anyoona)". A major hit in Europe, it peaked at number two in Italy and number three in Finland. Additionally, it reached number 26 in the UK, number 28 in Switzerland, number 29 in Scotland and number 30 in Germany.

Critical reception
James Masterton for Dotmusic described the song as "more atmospheric meanderings" from Jam & Spoon. Pan-European magazine Music & Media wrote that the participation "is as simple as on Crystal Waters' "Gypsy Woman (La Da Da La Da Dee)" and Lavinia Jones' "Sing It To You (Dee-Doob-Dee-Doo)". The flamenco bit is another hook."

Music video
The accompanying music video of "Angel (Ladadi O-Heyo)" was directed by German director Marcus Nispel. It tells the story of two girls having sex with older men under hidden cameras. Then they are blackmailing those men with videotapes of the act. They drive around in a van and go to a cafe where they tear down the place, threatening people with guns. The police comes, surrounding the place. When the girls are refusing to come out and then shoot a young man, the police attacks and a smoke grenade are sent into the cafe. At last, when the girls come out, one of them is being shot down, and the other arrested. In between this depiction, Plavka performs, looking at the camera through a porthole window. Two versions of the video were released, a censored and an uncensored version.

Track listing
 12" single, Europe (1995)
"Angel (Ladadi O-Heyo)" (158 BPM Mix) – 8:59
"Can You Feel It" – 9:46

 CD single, UK (1995)
"Angel (Ladadi O-Heyo)" (Airplay Edit) – 3:48
"Angel (Ladadi O-Heyo)" (Airplay Edit #2) – 4:20
"Angel (Ladadi O-Heyo)" (La Fiesta Musical Mix) – 6:00
"Angel (Ladadi O-Heyo)" (Carl Cox Mix) – 6:25
"Angel (Ladadi O-Heyo)" (Pascha Mix) – 7:43
"Angel (Ladadi O-Heyo)" (Awex Mix) – 5:53

 CD maxi, Europe (1995)
"Angel (Ladadi O-Heyo)" (Airplay Edit) – 3:48
"Angel (Ladadi O-Heyo)" (Airplay Edit II) – 4:20
"Angel (Ladadi O-Heyo)" (158 BPM Mix) – 9:01
"Angel (Ladadi O-Heyo)" (150 BPM Mix) – 7:37
"Can You Feel It" – 9:49

Charts

References

1995 singles
1995 songs
Jam & Spoon songs
Dance Pool singles
Songs written by Nosie Katzmann
English-language German songs
Music videos directed by Marcus Nispel